Tapestry of Webs is the debut studio album by Past Lives. It was released on February 23, 2010. The album was recorded during the late summer and early fall of 2009. Initial tracking took place at Avast! Studios, with vocals and various overdubs at Steve Fisk's house. The album was produced, engineered, and mixed by Steve Fisk. Mastering was done by Ed Brooks at RFI Mastering.

Track listing 
 "Paralyzer" − 4:00
 "Falling Spikes" − 2:40
 "Past Lives" − 4:04
 "Don't Let the Ashes Fill Your Eyes" − 3:26
 "Deep in the Valley" − 3:56
 "K Hole" − 4:32
 "Hex Takes Hold" − 3:52
 "Vanishing Twin" − 4:14
 "Hospital White" − 2:52
 "At Rest" − 2:17
 "Aerosol Bouquet" − 4:06
 "There Is a Light So Bright It Blinds" − 6:09

Personnel

Band 
Jordan Blilie – vocals
Mark Gajadhar – drums
Morgan Henderson – baritone guitar, keyboards
Devin Welch – guitar

Additional musicians
Izaak Mills – tenor saxophone (tracks 11 and 12), flute (tracks 2, 6, 7)
Hannah Blilie – vocals (track 5)

Artwork
Ryan Iverson – cover painting, Tapestry of Webs, and all artwork
Strath Shepard/Pacific Standard – layout

References

External links 
SuicideSqueeze.net

Suicide Squeeze Records albums
2010 albums
Past Lives (band) albums